Lori Kerans was the head women's basketball coach at Millikin University for 32 years. In those 32 years she achieved 11 Conference Titles over 500 career wins and a national championship in 2005. She now is retired from coaching and works at Millikin University in the alumni department.
Lori Kerans has been Millikin University's Women's Basketball head coach since 1983. In 2013, she celebrated her 500th career win. Her teams were in Division 3 NCAA playoffs eleven times and won the 2005 NCAA Division III national championship.

References

Millikin University faculty
1963 births
Living people
People from Newton, Illinois